The anterior tympanic artery (glaserian artery) is a branch of (the mandibular part of) the maxillary artery. It passes through the petrotympanic fissure. It provides artieral supply to part of the lining of the middle ear. It is accompanied by the chorda tympani nerve.

Anatomy

Course and anastomoses 
It passes upward behind the temporomandibular articulation, enters the tympanic cavity through the petrotympanic fissure, and ramifies upon the tympanic membrane, forming a vascular circle around the membrane with the stylomastoid branch of the posterior auricular, and anastomosing with the artery of the pterygoid canal and with the caroticotympanic branch from the internal carotid.

References

External links
 

Arteries of the head and neck